Marlon Errol Garnett (born July 3, 1975) is an American-Belizean coach and former professional basketball player, currently an assistant coach for the Charlotte Hornets of the NBA.

Career 
Nicknamed "Money G", Garnett played collegiately for the Broncos of Santa Clara University, winning West Coast Conference player of the year honors in 1997.

Garnett entered the National Basketball Association in February 1999, signing with the Boston Celtics as an undrafted free agent. Garnett appeared in 24 games, totaling 51 points, 21 rebounds, and 18 assists. He later played professionally in Europe (Spain, Italy and Croatia), including a stint with Benetton Treviso in which he won the Italian Cup in 2005.

During the 2015–16 NBA season, Garnett would work with the San Antonio Spurs as both a video coordinator and a player development coordinator. On July 27, 2016, Garnett would make his official move into the coaching world for the NBA by being both an assistant head coach and a player development coach for the Phoenix Suns. While he was interested in staying with San Antonio and helping them transition right after Tim Duncan's retirement in the league, Garnett ultimately decided to help out the Suns in order to properly build the team up and assist them moving forward. Under his second season with the Suns, Garnett became the head coach for the 2017 NBA Summer League. Garnett would later be promoted to a full-time assistant coach for the Suns on October 23, 2017.

On May 22, 2018, it was reported that Garnett would be hired by the Atlanta Hawks under new head coach Lloyd Pierce's coaching staff.

See also
 List of foreign NBA coaches
 List of foreign NBA players

References

External links
Marlon Garnett Info Page at NBA.com

1975 births
Living people
20th-century African-American sportspeople
21st-century African-American sportspeople
ABA League players
African-American basketball players
American expatriate basketball people in Croatia
American expatriate basketball people in Iran
American expatriate basketball people in Italy
American expatriate basketball people in Slovakia
American expatriate basketball people in Spain
American men's basketball players
Atlanta Hawks assistant coaches
Atléticos de San Germán players
Basketball coaches from California
Basketball players from Los Angeles
Belizean men's basketball players
Boston Celtics players
CB Estudiantes players
Olimpia Milano players
KK Cedevita players
KK Split players
KK Zadar players
Liga ACB players
Mahram Tehran BC players
Pallacanestro Treviso players
Pallacanestro Varese players
Phoenix Suns assistant coaches
Santa Clara Broncos men's basketball players
San Antonio Spurs assistant coaches
Shooting guards
Undrafted National Basketball Association players
Zob Ahan Isfahan BC players